The weather rock or weather stone is a humour display that pokes fun at the intricate technology used in modern weather forecasts, as well as the fact that their accuracy is less than perfect. A rock is typically hung from a tripod and accompanied by a sign indicating how to read it. A portable example of such a display, "the famous Maine Weather Stone" of Audubon Camp, Hog Island, was described in 1982.

Instructions 

Some examples of the instructions commonly provided for "reading" a weather rock include:

If the rock is wet, it's raining.
If the rock is swinging, the wind is blowing.
If the rock casts a shadow, the sun is shining.
If the rock does not cast a shadow and is not wet, the sky is cloudy.
If the rock is difficult to see, it is foggy.
If the rock is white, it is snowing.
If the rock is coated with ice, there is a frost.
If the ice is thick, it's a heavy frost.
If the rock is bouncing, there is an earthquake.
If the rock is under water, there is a flood.
If the rock is warm, it is sunny.
If the rock is missing, there was a tornado.
If the rock is wet and swinging violently, there is a hurricane.
If the rock can be felt but not seen, it is night time.
If the rock has white splats on it, watch out for birds.
If there are two rocks, stop drinking, you are drunk.

Weather rocks will also sometimes include rules for proper maintenance of the system such as, "Please do not disturb the weather rock, it is a finely tuned instrument!"

String variation 

In certain circumstances the string may be incorporated into the saying:

If the string is on fire then there is a bushfire.
If the string is cut a Wendigo has passed by.

Locations
 

Weather rocks are located all over the world. Some examples include: 

United States
The weather rock at Fort Drum, a US military site in New York
In the Nature Area at Camp Rotary, a Boy Scout summer camp located in Clare, Michigan
Camp Wolfeboro, a Boy Scout summer camp in Arnold, California
Camp Yawgoog, a Boy Scout summer camp at the Yawgoog Scout Reservation in Rockville, Rhode Island
The Donner's Pass Historic Site, near Lake Tahoe, CA
Elliot's Weather Rock in Clearfield, PA
Bloomington Zoo in Central Illinois
In Rhododendron, Oregon, near the Zigzag River off Road 10
On Spangler Road near Highway 213 in Oregon City, Oregon
Boron, California, in front of Domingo's Mexican and Seafood Restaurant, a famous astronaut hangout near Edwards Air Force Base
Seven Ranges Boy Scout Reservation in Kensington, Ohio
Firelands Scout Reservation in Wakeman, Ohio
Nature Camp in Vesuvius, Virginia
Whippi Dip ice cream store, at the Pontaluna road in Spring Lake, MI, near Hoffmaster State Park
Lynnhaven Inlet Fishing Pier in Virginia Beach
The Kia Kima Scout Reservation in Hardy, Arkansas
Casa Sul Lago
Canada
At the Pancake Bay Trading Post, near Pancake Bay Provincial Park, Ontario
Australia
Outside the McDonald's restaurant in Lithgow, NSW
Tenterfield in NSW
Ficks crossing near Kingaroy QLD
Pannawonica in WA 
Netherlands
Oostdorp
United Kingdom
Lobster Pot Tea-room on the island of Berneray in the Outer Hebrides, Scotland
South Africa
The Halyards Hotel in Port Alfred
Argentina
Glaciarium Museum, El Calafate
Japan
, Shizuoka Prefecture
Ireland
 In Dublin's Brazen Head Pub there's a weather forecasting stone.

References

See also 
 Nowcasting (meteorology)

Jokes
Weather lore